Uma Bawang is a village located in Lirong Kawit, the settlement in state of Sarawak. This village consists of a single longhouse that located near Baram River and the population is 100 as of 1990 that consists of Kayan people.

Sister cities 
As designed by Sister Cities International, Uma Bawang has maintained sister cities with:
 Berkeley, California, 1991

References 

Miri Division
Villages in Sarawak